The Vortech Sparrow is an American autogyro that was produced by Vortech of Fallston, Maryland. When it was available the aircraft was supplied in the form of plans for amateur construction. Vortech also supplied rotor blades  and some key parts for the design.

Available in 2005, by January 2015 the aircraft was no longer listed on the Vortech website.

Design and development
It features a single main rotor, a single-seat open cockpit without a windshield, tricycle landing gear, plus a tail caster. The standard engine used is the twin cylinder, air-cooled, two-stroke, dual-ignition  Rotax 503 engine mounted in pusher configuration.

The aircraft fuselage is made from metal tubing.

The manufacturer estimated the construction time as 150 hours.

Operational history
By 1998 the company reported that more than six kits had been sold, were completed and flying.

Specifications (Sparrow)

See also
List of rotorcraft

References

Sparrow
1990s United States sport aircraft
1990s United States civil utility aircraft
Homebuilt aircraft
Single-engined pusher autogyros